Geesteren may refer to:

 Geesteren, Overijssel, a village in the municipality of Tubberbergen, Netherlands
 Geesteren, Gelderland, a village in the municipality of Berkelland, Netherlands